Events in the year 1890 in Argentina.

Incumbents
President: Miguel Ángel Juárez Celman until August 6, Carlos Pellegrini
Vice President: Carlos Pellegrini until August 6, then vacant

Governors
 Buenos Aires Province: Dardo Rocha 
 Cordoba: Marcos Juárez then Eleazar Garzón
 Mendoza Province: Domingo Bombal (until 10 June); Oseas Guiñazú (from 10 June)
 Santa Fe Province: José Gálvez then Juan Manuel Cafferata

Vice Governors
 Buenos Aires Province: Claudio Stegmann (until 1 May); Víctor del Carril (starting 1 May)

Events
July 26 - Revolution of the Park

Births
May 2 - Teddie Gerard, actress and entertainer (d. 1942)

Deaths

References

 
1890s in Argentina
Argentina
Argentina
Years of the 20th century in Argentina